Tramezaïgues (official name) or Tramezaygues (local name) is a commune in the Hautes-Pyrénées department, in the Occitanie region of France.

Geography

The commune of Tramezaïgues, in the south of the Hautes-Pyrénées department, extends from the Aure Valley to the Spanish border.

The village is located at the foot of Pic de Tramezaïgues , and at the confluence of the Neste d'Aure and the Neste de Rioumajou. The name of Tramezaïgues is derived from the Latin description: inter ambas aquas (between two waters).

To the north of the village is the Pla d'Adet ski resort, and Aragnouet is to the west. East of the village is Loudenvielle and the Col de Val Louron-Azet. Cadeilhan-Trachère and Saint-Lary-Soulan are situated to the north-east. The Spanish border is to the south of the village.

History

The Château de Tramezaygues has been existent since the 12th century. The château was a position for monitoring the Spanish border until the French Revolution.

Sites and monuments
The ruins of the 12th Century Château de Tramezaygues, restored in 1990 is a listed historic monument since 1980.
The Saint-Denis Saint-Nicolas Church, of which survives the original apse of Romanesque style. The rest of the church was modified during the 16th, 17th and 19th centuries.

Politics and administration

Demographics
In 2017, the commune had 34 inhabitants.

Gallery

See also
Communes of the Hautes-Pyrénées department

References

Communes of Hautes-Pyrénées